The Limbuwan–Gorkha War was a series of battles fought between the king of Gorkha and the rulers of various principalities of Limbuwan from 1771 to 1774 AD. After the conquest of Majh Kirat (Khambuwan kingdoms) and Wallo Kirat by the Gorkhas, they invaded Limbuwan on two fronts. One front was in Chainpur (present-day Sankhuwasabha District) and the second front was in Bijaypur (present-day Dharan, Sunsari District). Bijaypur was the capital of the Morang Kingdom of Limbuwan Yakthung Laje.

The war came to an end in 1774 AD with the ceasefire treaty, "treaty of Salt and Water," between Yakthung Laje Limbuwan king and Gorkha king. It recognized co-existence of government system and equal rights between Gorkha King and Yakthung Laje Limbuwan Kings. The war was ended with the signing  of the Limbu-Gorkha treaty which ceded the much of this territory east of Arun river to the Gorkha kingdom.

See also 
 History of Limbuwan
 Limbuwan
 Limbu
 Iman Singh Chemjong

References 
.

History of Nepal
History of Sikkim
Gurkhas
Limbu people
Wars involving Nepal
Battles of the Unification of Nepal
1771 in Nepal
1774 in Nepal